This is a list of cases reported in volume 2 U.S. (2 Dall.) of United States Reports, decided by the Supreme Court of the United States from 1791 to 1793. Case reports from other federal and state tribunals also appear in 2 U.S. (2 Dall.).

Alexander Dallas and Dallas Reports 
Not all of the cases reported in 2 U.S. (2 Dall.) are from the United States Supreme Court. The volume includes decisions from various Pennsylvania appellate and trial courts, and from several federal courts.
Alexander J. Dallas, a Philadelphia lawyer and later United States Secretary of the Treasury, had been in the business of reporting local law cases for newspapers and periodicals. When the U.S. Supreme Court sat in Philadelphia from 1791 to 1800, he collected their cases as well, and later began compiling his case reports in a bound volume which he called Reports of cases ruled and adjudged in the courts of Pennsylvania, before and since the Revolution.

When the U.S. Supreme Court along with the rest of the new federal government moved in 1791 from the former capital of New York City to the nation's temporary capital in Philadelphia, Dallas was appointed the Supreme Court's first unofficial and unpaid Supreme Court Reporter. (Court reporters in that age received no salary, but were expected to profit from the publication and sale of their compiled decisions.) Dallas continued to collect and publish Pennsylvania and other decisions. When the U.S. Supreme Court began to hear cases and file opinions, he added U.S. Supreme Court cases to the second volume of his reports. As Lawrence M. Friedman has explained: "In this volume, quietly and unobtrusively, began that magnificent series of reports, extending in an unbroken line to the present, that chronicles the work of the world's most powerful court." Dallas published four volumes of decisions during his tenure as Reporter, known as the Dallas Reports.

The Supreme Court moved to the new capital city of Washington, D.C. in 1800. Dallas remained in Philadelphia; William Cranch then replaced him as Reporter of Decisions of the Supreme Court of the United States.

Nominative Reports 
In 1874, the U.S. government created the United States Reports, and retroactively numbered older privately published case reports as part of the new series. As a result, cases appearing in volumes 1–90 of U.S. Reports have dual citation forms; one for the volume number of U.S. Reports, and one for the volume number of the reports named for the relevant reporter of decisions (these are called "nominative reports"). As such, volumes 1–4 of United States Reports correspond to volumes 1–4 of Dallas Reports. The dual citation form of, for example, Oswald v. New York is 2 U.S. (2 Dall.) 401 (1791).

Courts in 2 U.S. (2 Dall.) 
The cases reported in 2 U.S. (2 Dall.) come from the Pennsylvania High Court of Errors and Appeals (Pa. Ct. Err. & App.) (which from its creation in 1780 to its dissolution in 1808 was the court of last resort in the Pennsylvania judiciary); Supreme Court of Pennsylvania (Pa.); Pennsylvania Court of Common Pleas (Pa. Ct. Com. Pl.); Supreme Court of the United States; United States Court of Appeals in Cases of Capture (Ct. App. in Cases of Capture); United States Circuit Court for the District of Pennsylvania (C.C.D. Pa.). (To avoid confusion, the Court of Errors and Appeals will be cited as "Pa. Ct. Err. & App." rather than as "Pa.", although the latter abbreviation should be used, according to Bluebook rules, for the highest court in Pennsylvania at a particular time. Rather, "Pa." will consistently be used to indicate the Supreme Court of Pennsylvania.)

Justices of the Supreme Court at the time of 2 U.S. (2 Dall.) 

The Supreme Court is established by Article III, Section 1 of the Constitution of the United States, which says: "The judicial Power of the United States, shall be vested in one supreme Court . . .". The size of the Court is not specified; the Constitution leaves it to Congress to set the number of justices. Under the Judiciary Act of 1789 Congress originally fixed the number of justices at six (one chief justice and five associate justices). Since 1789 Congress has varied the size of the Court from six to seven, nine, ten, and back to nine justices (always including one chief justice).

When the cases in 2 U.S. (2 Dall.) were decided, the Court comprised these six justices:

Notable Case in 2 U.S. (2 Dall.)

West v. Barnes 
West v. Barnes, 2 U.S. (2 Dall.) 401 (1791), is the first United States Supreme Court decision and the earliest case calling for oral argument. Van Staphorst v. Maryland (1791) was docketed prior to West v. Barnes but settled before the Court heard the case: West was argued on August 2, 1791 and decided on August 3, 1791. Collet v. Collet (1792) was the first appellate case docketed with the Court but was dropped before it could be heard. Supreme Court Reporter Alexander Dallas did not publish the justices' full opinions in West v. Barnes, which were published in various newspapers around the country at the time, but he published an abbreviated summary of the decisions.

The Court ultimately decided West on procedural grounds, holding that a writ of error (a kind of appeal) must be issued within ten days by the Clerk of the Supreme Court of the United States as required by federal statute, and not by a lower court located closer to the plaintiff in Rhode Island. As a result of this case, Congress ultimately changed this procedure with the ninth section of the Process and Compensation Act of 1792, allowing circuit courts to issue these writs, thereby assisting citizens living far away from the capital.

Chisholm v. Georgia 
Chisholm v. Georgia, 2 U.S. (2 Dall.) 419 (1793), is considered the first United States Supreme Court case of significance and impact. Given its early date, there was little available legal precedent (particularly in U.S. law). The Court's holding in the case was superseded in 1795 by the 11th Amendment. Under the 11th Amendment, citizens of one state or of foreign countries can only sue a state with the state's consent or if Congress, pursuant to a valid exercise of 14th Amendment remedial powers, abrogates the states' immunity from suit.

Citation style 

Under the Judiciary Act of 1789 the federal court structure at the time comprised District Courts, which had general trial jurisdiction; Circuit Courts, which had mixed trial and appellate (from the US District Courts) jurisdiction; and the United States Supreme Court, which had appellate jurisdiction over the federal District and Circuit courts—and for certain issues over state courts. The Supreme Court also had limited original jurisdiction (i.e., in which cases could be filed directly with the Supreme Court without first having been heard by a lower federal or state court). There were one or more federal District Courts and/or Circuit Courts in each state, territory, or other geographical region.

Bluebook citation style is used for case names, citations, and jurisdictions.
 e.g.,"C.C.D.N.J." = United States Circuit Court for the District of New Jersey
 e.g.,"D. Mass." = United States District Court for the District of Massachusetts
 "E." = Eastern; "M." = Middle; "N." = Northern; "S." = Southern; "W." = Western
 e.g.,"C.C.S.D.N.Y." = United States Circuit Court for the Southern District of New York
 e.g.,"M.D. Ala." = United States District Court for the Middle District of Alabama
 "Ct. Cl." = United States Court of Claims
 "Ct. Com. Pl." = Court of Common Pleas (a state court)
 The abbreviation of a state's name alone indicates the highest appellate court in that state's judiciary at the time.
 e.g.,"Pa." = Supreme Court of Pennsylvania
 e.g.,"Me." = Supreme Judicial Court of Maine

List of cases in 2 U.S. (2 Dall.)

Cases of the Supreme Court of the United States

Cases of other tribunals 
Note on Respublica: A number of cases listed below include the title Respublica. Res publica is a Latin form of the term "Commonwealth," meaning in this context the "Commonwealth of Pennsylvania." Pennsylvania is one of four states (along with Massachusetts, Virginia, and Kentucky) to refer to itself as a "Commonwealth." It is interchangeable with "State." In the early 19th Century the English term Commonwealth replaced Respublica in new Pennsylvania case names.

Notes and References

See also 
 Certificate of division

External links 
  Case reports in volume 2 (2 Dall.) from Court Listener
  Case reports in volume 2 (2 Dall.) from the Caselaw Access Project of Harvard Law School
  Case reports in volume 2 (2 Dall.) from Justia
  Case reports in volume 2 (2 Dall.) from Open Jurist
 Website of the United States Supreme Court
 United States Courts website about the Supreme Court
 National Archives, Records of the Supreme Court of the United States
 American Bar Association, How Does the Supreme Court Work?
 The Supreme Court Historical Society